Zach Railey (born May 9, 1984) is an American sailor and Olympic athlete. Zach won a silver medal in sailing at the 2008 Summer Olympics and competed in the 2012 Olympic games in London. He was born in St. Petersburg, Florida.

References 

 
 Official website

1984 births
American male sailors (sport)
Clearwater High School alumni
Living people
Olympic silver medalists for the United States in sailing
Sailors at the 2008 Summer Olympics – Finn
Sailors at the 2012 Summer Olympics – Finn
Medalists at the 2008 Summer Olympics